Crab Day is the fourth studio album by Welsh musician Cate Le Bon, released on 15 April 2016 by Drag City, Turnstile Music, and Caroline International. It was produced by Josiah Steinbrick and Noah Georgeson and recorded at Panoramic House, a hilltop mansion in the coastal town of Stinson Beach, California. The artist Phil Collins created a short film set in Berlin to coincide with the release.

Recording
After the experience working with American musician Tim Presley as DRINKS, Le Bon changed her working method. She created short demos and used different instruments. Lyrics were written after the music had been completed. She described the process as "the songs were mapped out in my head and I had vocal melodies, just not lyrics". When the songs had been developed, they were rehearsed over five days together with Stephen Black (bass), H. Hawkline (guitar) and Stella Mozgawa (drums). Upon entering the studio, recording was completed over five days after which Le Bon completed her vocals and overdubs. It was followed by the process of selecting the songs and running order for the album.

Critical reception

Crab Day received positive reviews from contemporary music critics. At Metacritic, which assigns a normalized rating out of 100 to reviews from mainstream critics, the album received an average score of 75, based on 21 reviews, which indicates "generally favorable reviews".

Laura Snapes of Pitchfork Media gave the album a favorable review, stating, "Crab Day is a voyage into doubt led by a queasy compass, and a ringleader who's prepared to stake out uncertain territory. Le Bon always keeps you guessing, making the old traditions of guitar-oriented rock feel arbitrary, too. Her nervy assessments of the world are filled with equal parts suspense and heart, and beautifully zany riffs, where the feeling of being frayed by uncertainty comes together into a strangely comforting patchwork."

Accolade

Track listing

Personnel
Credits adapted from the liner notes of Crab Day.

Musicians
 Cate Le Bon – guitar, piano , percussion , synthesizer , marimba 
 Josiah Steinbrick – bass , piano , percussion 
 Stephen Black – bass , clarinet , saxophone 
 H. Hawkline – guitar , marimba , synthesizer 
 Stella Mozgawa – drums 

Production and artwork
 Josiah Steinbrick – production
 Noah Georgeson – production, mixing
 Samur Khouja – engineering
 JJ Golden – mastering
 Isabel Vollrath – kimono jacket
 Christian Fritzenwanker – make up
 Ivana Klickovic – cover photography, insert photography
 H. Hawkline – sleeve

References

External links

Cate Le Bon albums
2016 albums
Drag City (record label) albums
Albums produced by Noah Georgeson
Albums produced by Josiah Steinbrick